DNA-directed RNA polymerase II subunit RPB7 is an enzyme that in humans is encoded by the POLR2G gene.

This gene encodes the seventh largest subunit of RNA polymerase II, the polymerase responsible for synthesizing messenger RNA in eukaryotes. In yeast, the association of this subunit with the polymerase under suboptimal growth conditions indicates it may play a role in regulating polymerase function.

Interactions
POLR2G has been shown to interact with TAF15, POLR2C, POLR2H and POLR2E.

References

Further reading